Road 51 is an important road in Iran connecting Shahrekord and Isfahan's satellite cities to Isfahan.

References

External links 

 Iran road map on Young Journalists Club

Roads in Iran